Beatriz Noheda is a professor at the University of Groningen and the director of the Groningen Cognitive Systems and Materials Center (CogniGron ). She is particularly well known for discovering the monoclinic phase at the morphotropic phase boundary in lead zirconate titanate (PZT) and other piezoelectrics,  for her pioneering work in ferroelectric hafnia and for the development of memristors.

Education 

Noheda received her PhD in 1996 from the Autonomous University of Madrid.

Career and research 
The centre of interest of Noheda is linking the atomic structure of functional oxides. For example, her group has used X-ray diffraction and high-resolution electron microscopy to reveal the existence of a rhombohedral ferroelectric phase in hafnia. She conducted part of this research while being an assistant physicist at the Brookhaven National Laboratory and now as a full professor at the University of Groningen.

Award and recognition 
In 2020, Noheda received the IEEE Robert E. Newnham Ferroelectrics Award for "her outstanding contributions to the understanding of the giant piezoelectricity in lead zirconate titanate and ferroelectric relaxors, based on her discovery of their low symmetry phases". She is a fellow of the American Physical Society since 2011. In 2003 Noheda was one of the three recipients of a Rosalind Franklin Fellowship She is featured as one of the "100 Inspirational profiles" of Lynnette Madsen's book Successful Women Ceramic and Glass Scientists and Engineers.
She is also a member of editorial board for a range of scientific journals.

References 

Year of birth missing (living people)
Living people
Academic staff of the University of Groningen
Autonomous University of Madrid alumni
Fellows of the American Physical Society